Valusia is the fourth EP by American singer-songwriter Zola Jesus. It was released on October 15, 2010 on Sacred Bones Records.

Track listing

References

2010 EPs
Zola Jesus albums